John Wenk (born 4 October 1938) is a British middle-distance runner. He competed in the men's 800 metres at the 1960 Summer Olympics.

References

1938 births
Living people
Athletes (track and field) at the 1960 Summer Olympics
Scottish male middle-distance runners
Olympic athletes of Great Britain
Athletes (track and field) at the 1962 British Empire and Commonwealth Games
Commonwealth Games competitors for Scotland
People from Welwyn